The Province of Tarlac held its local elections on Monday, May 9, 2016, as a part of the 2016 Philippine general election.  Voters selected candidates for all local positions: a town mayor, vice mayor and town councilors, as well as members of the Sangguniang Panlalawigan, the vice-governor, governor and representatives for the three districts of Tarlac. In the gubernatorial race, Tarlac's incumbent 2nd district Representative Susan Yap, sister of incumbent governor Victor Yap, defeated incumbent Tarlac City Mayor Gelacio Manalang.

In the vice gubernatorial race, incumbent 3rd district Board Member Carlito David narrowly defeated former Vice Governor Pearl Pacada as well as incumbent Paniqui Mayor Miguel Cojuangco-Rivilla.

Provincial elections
The candidates for governor and vice governor with the highest number of votes wins the seat; they are voted separately, therefore, they may be of different parties when elected.

Gubernatorial election
Parties are as stated in their certificate of candidacies. Incumbent governor Victor Yap is term limited and is running for congressman of Tarlac's 2nd district. His sister, incumbent 2nd district congresswoman Susan Yap is running in his place.

Results by city/municipality

Vice-gubernatorial election

Results by city/municipality

Congressional elections
Each of Tarlac's three legislative districts will elect each representative to the House of Representatives. The candidate with the highest number of votes wins the seat.

1st District
Municipalities: Anao, Camiling, Mayantoc, Moncada, Paniqui, Pura, Ramos, San Clemente, San Manuel, Santa Ignacia

2nd District
City: Tarlac City
Municipalities: Gerona, Victoria, San Jose
Parties are as stated in their certificate of candidacies. Incumbent governor Victor Yap is term limited and is running for congressman of Tarlac's 2nd district. His sister, incumbent 2nd district congresswoman Susan Yap is running in his place.

3rd District
Municipalities: Bamban, Capas, Concepcion, La Paz
Noel Villanueva is the incumbent. He changed his party affiliation from Nacionalista to NPC.

Provincial Board elections
All 3 Districts of Tarlac will elect Sangguniang Panlalawigan or provincial board members.  Election is via plurality-at-large voting. The total votes are the actual number of voters who voted, not the total votes of all candidates

1st District

Municipalities: Anao, Camiling, Mayantoc, Moncada, Paniqui, Pura, Ramos, San Clemente, San Manuel, Santa Ignacia

|-
|colspan=5 bgcolor=black|

2nd District

City: Tarlac City
Municipalities: Gerona, Victoria, San Jose

|-
|colspan=5 bgcolor=black|

3rd District
Municipalities: Bamban, Capas, Concepcion, La Paz

|-
|colspan=5 bgcolor=black|

References

External links
Commission on Elections

Elections in Tarlac
2016 Philippine local elections